Sergey Anatolyevich Kovalenko (born 5 February 1970 in Lutsk, Ukraine SSR, Soviet Union) is a Russian rifle shooter. He competed in the 50 m rifle prone event at the 2012 Summer Olympics, where he placed 19th.

References

1970 births
Living people
Russian male sport shooters
Olympic shooters of Russia
Shooters at the 1996 Summer Olympics
Shooters at the 2000 Summer Olympics
Shooters at the 2004 Summer Olympics
Shooters at the 2008 Summer Olympics
Shooters at the 2012 Summer Olympics